Rosewood River, a perennial river of the Bellinger River catchment, is located in the Mid North Coast region of New South Wales, Australia.

Course and features
Rosewood River rises on the eastern slopes of the Dorrigo Plateau, part of the Great Dividing Range, within Dorrigo National Park east of Dorrigo, and flows in a meandering course south before reaching its confluence with the Bellinger River near Thora.

See also

 Rivers of New South Wales
 List of rivers of New South Wales (L–Z)
 List of rivers of Australia

References

Rivers of New South Wales
Mid North Coast